Chaltia is a census town in the Berhampore CD block in the Berhampore subdivision of the Murshidabad district in the state of West Bengal, India.

Geography

Location                                

Demographics
According to the 2011 Census of India, Chaltia had a total population of 25,336, of which 12,803 (51%) were males and 12,533 (49%) were females. Population in the age range 0-6 years was 2,159. The total number of literate persons in Chaltia was 19,865 (85.71% of the population 6 years).

Infrastructure
According to the District Census Handbook, Murshidabad,  2011, Chaltia covered an area of 5.1303 km2. It had 10 km roads with both open and closed drains. The protected water-supply involved overhead tank, tube well/ bore well. It had 2,474 domestic electric connections. Among the medical facilities it had 3 medicine shops. Among the educational facilities, it had 1 primary school, 1 secondary school, senior secondary school, general degree college at Berhampore 1 km away. It had the branch office of 1 cooperative bank.

Healthcare 
Berhampore CD block is one of the areas of Murshidabad district where ground water is affected by high level of arsenic contamination. The WHO guideline for arsenic in drinking water is 10 mg/ litre, and the Indian Standard value is 50 mg/ litre. The maximum concentration in Berhampore CD block is 635 mg/litre.

References

Cities and towns in Murshidabad district